Waachiim Spiritwolf is a Native American professional mixed martial artist who last competed in the Welterweight division. A professional competitor since from 2006 until 2015, he competed for King of the Cage, Tachi Palace Fights, Bellator, and Strikeforce.

Background
Spiritwolf is from the Pala Indian Reservation and represents the Navajo and Yaqui tribes. In high school, he was a talented wrestler and was also a captain of his football team, playing the inside linebacker position. He was introduced to mixed martial arts when he began training in Brazilian jiu-jitsu with his friend and professional mixed martial artist, Dean Lister. Spiritwolf had known Lister since he was in middle school and both of them were fans of mixed martial arts, watching UFC fights together. Lister is also the godfather of Spiritwolf's son. Spiritwolf coaches wrestling at Scripps Ranch High School.

Mixed martial arts career

Early career
After competing for local events and King of the Cage, Spiritwolf was booked for the main card of the Ultimate Chaos pay-per-view. Prior to the bout, Spiritwolf accused his heavily-favored opponent Brett Cooper of looking ahead to his August 1 bout at Affliction: Trilogy. Spiritwolf was able to get the upset and knocked out Cooper in the first round. Spiritwolf also received a notable win over UFC veteran Crafton Wallace, before signing with Strikeforce in late-2010.

King of the Cage
In December 2008, Spiritwolf signed with California based promotion King of the Cage. He made his debut for the promotion on December 11, 2008, facing Ricky Legere at KOTC: Prowler. Spiritwolf won the bout via second round TKO. In his second fight for the promotion, Spiritwolf faced Ricky Legere in a rematch at KOTC: Distorted on October 1, 2009, for the KOTC Welterweight Championship. He lost the bout via TKO.

He then faced Ismael Gonzalez at KOTC: Arrival on February 25, 2010. The bout was ruled a technical draw, after Spiritwolf landed a punch to the back of the head, to which Gonzalez subsequently claimed that he couldn't see straight.

Strikeforce
Spiritwolf signed with Strikeforce to fight undefeated Billy Evangelista in a 165-Catchweight bout at Strikeforce Challengers: Bowling vs. Voelker. Spiritwolf started off the first round by knocking down Evangelista, and then landed another takedown, using the ground and pound technique. Spiritwolf landed three more takedowns in the second round, but Evangelista seemed to have a better round, landing punches and more knees from the clinch. The 34-year-old Spiritwolf seemed to be tired during the third round as Evangelista landed combinations, but continued to hold his own, demonstrating his true heart by answering back with some big punches, and then slamming the undefeated Evangelista in the final ten seconds. However, Evangelista would remain undefeated as the judges scored the contest in favor of him, making Evangelista the winner via unanimous decision.

Spiritwolf said after the fight he should have won. "I come to fight and that's what I did tonight," he said. "It is bad enough I thought I deserved the decision, but to not get a round on those scorecards is ridiculous. Honestly, I feel I got ripped off."

Spiritwolf fought DREAM Welterweight Champion Marius Zaromskis at Strikeforce Challengers: Wilcox vs. Ribeiro. However, the bout was declared a no contest six seconds into the first round after Spiritwolf was accidentally poked in the eye.

Bellator
Spiritwolf made his debut for Bellator in March 2011. He faced Jaime Jara at Bellator 35 and won the back-and-forth battle via split decision. Although the bout took place on the unaired preliminary portion of the card, Bellator CEO Bjorn Rebney stated that fan interest to see the fight convinced him to air it during the following week's Bellator 36 airing on MTV2.

In his second fight for the promotion, Spiritwolf faced Marius Žaromskis in a rematch. Spiritwolf weighed in a pound and a half overweight and was forced to forfeit part of his purse. Once again, the contest between the two ended in controversy as the doctor stopped the fight between rounds two and three due to a cut suffered by Spiritwolf, giving Žaromskis the TKO win.

Due to the controversial nature of this stoppage, Spiritwolf and Marius Žaromskis had a rematch - the third fight between the two - at Bellator 72. He lost the fight via split decision.

Spiritwolf returned to the promotion on March 21, 2013 to face former UFC veteran Marcus Davis at Bellator 93. Unfortunately, the bout ended in a no contest when Davis hit Spiritwolf with a knee to the groin, in the first round and he could not continue.

Independent promotions
Spiritwolf faced Morten Djursaa at EUMMA 5 on April 19, 2013. He lost the bout via KO, less than a minute within the fight. He then got his first win since his Bellator debut, when he defeated James Chaney at Shinzo Fight Sport on August 16, 2013, via second round TKO.

He faced independent prospect Max Griffin at TWC 19 on January 15, 2014. He lost the fight via split decision. Spiritwolf was expected to face Angel Deanda at Tachi Palace Fights 20 on August 7, 2014. However, the bout would be cancelled for unknown reasons.

Championships and accomplishments
World Fighting Championships
WFC Welterweight Championship (One time)

Mixed martial arts record

|-
| Win
| align=center| 12–13–1 (2)
| J.C. Llamas
| Decision (unanimous)
| TWC 22: The Warriors Cage
| 
| align=center| 3
| align=center| 5:00
| Porterville, California, United States
| 
|-
| Win
| align=center| 11–13–1 (2)
| Edward Darby
| TKO (punches)
| XPS: Wasteland
| 
| align=center| 1
| align=center| 1:51
| Valley Center, California, United States
| 
|-
| Loss
| align=center| 10–13–1 (2)
| Max Griffin
| Decision (split)
| TWC 1: Blackout
| 
| align=center| 3
| align=center| 5:00
| Porterville, California, United States
| 
|-
| Win
| align=center| 10–12–1 (2)
| James Chaney
| TKO (punches)
| Shinzo Fight Sport
| 
| align=center| 2
| align=center| 4:07
| Guatemala City, Guatemala
| 
|-
| Loss
| align=center| 9–12–1 (2)
| Morten Djursaa
| KO (head kick and punches)
| EUMMA 5
| 
| align=center| 1
| align=center| 0:40
| Frederiksberg, Copenhagen, Denmark
| 
|-
| NC
| align=center| 9–11–1 (2)
| Marcus Davis
| NC (knee to the groin)
| Bellator 93
| 
| align=center| 1
| align=center| 3:05
| Lewiston, Maine, United States
| Spiritwolf could not continue after an illegal knee to the groin by Davis.
|-
| Loss
| align=center| 9–11–1 (1)
| Marius Žaromskis
| Decision (split)
| Bellator 72
| 
| align=center| 3
| align=center| 5:00
| Tampa, Florida, United States
| 
|-
| Loss
| align=center| 9–10–1 (1)
| Marius Žaromskis
| TKO (cut)
| Bellator 68
| 
| align=center| 2
| align=center| 5:00
| Atlantic City, New Jersey, United States
| 
|-
| Loss
| align=center| 9–9–1 (1)
| Michael Madrid
| Decision (unanimous)
| Samurai MMA Pro 2011
| 
| align=center| 3
| align=center| 5:00
| Culver City, California, United States
| 
|-
| Loss
| align=center| 9–8–1 (1)
| Jorge Lopez
| Decision (unanimous)
| TPF 9: The Contenders
| 
| align=center| 3
| align=center| 5:00
| Lemoore, California, United States
| 
|-
| Win
| align=center| 9–7–1 (1)
| Jaime Jara
| Decision (split)
| Bellator 35
| 
| align=center| 3
| align=center| 5:00
| Lemoore, California, United States
| 
|-
| NC
| align=center| 8–7–1 (1)
| Marius Žaromskis
| NC (eye poke)
| Strikeforce Challengers: Wilcox vs. Ribeiro
| 
| align=center| 1
| align=center| 0:06
| Jackson, Mississippi, United States
| Accidental eye poke by Žaromskis.
|-
| Loss
| align=center| 8–7–1
| Billy Evangelista
| Decision (unanimous)
| Strikeforce Challengers: Bowling vs. Voelker
| 
| align=center| 3
| align=center| 5:00
| Fresno, California, United States
| 
|-
| Loss
| align=center| 8–6–1
| Delson Heleno
| Decision (unanimous)
| AOF 9: Apocalypse
| 
| align=center| 3
| align=center| 5:00
| Jacksonville, Florida, United States
| 
|-
| Win
| align=center| 8–5–1
| Crafton Wallace
| TKO (doctor stoppage)
| AOF 8: Fury
| 
| align=center| 1
| align=center| 5:00
| Estero, Florida, United States
| 
|-
| Win
| align=center| 7–5–1
| Fernando Bettega
| Decision (unanimous)
| Collision in the Cage
| 
| align=center| 3
| align=center| 5:00
| Irvine, California, United States
| 
|-
| Draw
| align=center| 6–5–1
| Ismael Gonzalez
| Technical draw
| KOTC: Arrival
| 
| align=center| 1
| align=center| 4:00
| Highland, California, United States
| 
|-
| Loss
| align=center| 6–5
| Ricky Legere
| TKO (punches)
| KOTC: Distorted
| 
| align=center| 2
| align=center| 2:25
| Highland, California, United States
| 
|-
| Win
| align=center| 6–4
| Brett Cooper
| TKO (punches)
| FFI: Ultimate Chaos
| 
| align=center| 1
| align=center| 3:41
| Biloxi, Mississippi, United States
| 
|-
| Win
| align=center| 5–4
| Ricky Legere
| KO (punch)
| KOTC: Prowler
| 
| align=center| 2
| align=center| 0:16
| Highland, California, United States
| 
|-
| Loss
| align=center| 4–4
| Ross Ebañez
| TKO (cut)
| ROTR: Beatdown 9
| 
| align=center| 1
| align=center| 2:53
| Hawaii, United States
| 
|-
| Win
| align=center| 4–3
| Danny Ruiz
| KO (punches)
| WFC 6: Battle in the Bay
| 
| align=center| 1
| align=center| 4:31
| Tampa, Florida, United States
| 
|-
| Loss
| align=center| 3–3
| Shamar Bailey
| Decision (unanimous)
| Revolution Fight League 1
| 
| align=center| 3
| align=center| 5:00
| Louisville, Kentucky, United States
| 
|-
| Win
| align=center| 3–2
| Roger Krahl
| Submission (guillotine choke)
| World Fighting Championships 5
| 
| align=center| 1
| align=center| 4:14
| Tampa, Florida, United States
| 
|-
| Loss
| align=center| 2–2
| Kenneth Alexander
| Submission (injury)
| Tuff-N-Uff 3
| 
| align=center| 1
| align=center| 4:55
| Las Vegas, Nevada, United States
| 
|-
| Win
| align=center| 2–1
| Enrique Luna
| TKO (strikes)
| Clash of the Titans 4
| 
| align=center| 2
| align=center| 1:11
| Tijuana, Mexico
| 
|-
| Loss
| align=center| 1–1
| Kyle Brees
| Decision (split)
| RITC 83: Rampage
| 
| align=center| 3
| align=center| 3:00
| Arizona, United States
| 
|-
| Win
| align=center| 1–0
| Anthony Soto
| TKO (punches)
| Cage of Fire 1
| 
| align=center| 1
| align=center| 3:42
| Tijuana, Mexico
|

References

External links

American male mixed martial artists
Living people
1976 births
Mixed martial artists from California
Welterweight mixed martial artists
Mixed martial artists utilizing wrestling
Mixed martial artists utilizing Brazilian jiu-jitsu
People from Fresno, California
American male sport wrestlers
Amateur wrestlers
American practitioners of Brazilian jiu-jitsu
Native American sportspeople